Coleman is a community in the Rocky Mountains within the Municipality of Crowsnest Pass in southwest Alberta, Canada. It was formerly incorporated as a town prior to 1979 when it amalgamated with four other municipalities to form Crowsnest Pass.

Coleman is located in Census Division No. 15 and in the riding of Macleod. It is served by Highway 3 (Crowsnest Highway) and the Canadian Pacific Railway.

History 
In 1903, a new townsite was laid out a few kilometres west of Blairmore, to service a new coal mine operated by the International Coal and Coke Company. Initial names of Paulson's Camp or McGillivray Hill were rejected by the post office, settling on Coleman (after the mother's maiden name of the president and mine owner A. C. Flumerfelt's wife, Ada, and the middle name of his youngest daughter, Norma Coleman Flumerfelt). Coleman was incorporated as a village on 11 January 1904. It then incorporated as a town on 10 September 1910.

A feature of Coleman was the mine's 100 (later 216) coke ovens located at it outskirts, which operated from 1906 to 1952. The town grew rapidly, surpassing its neighbour Blairmore as the largest in the region. Coleman had an opera house from 1908 until it burned down in 1948.

Coleman persevered through strikes (1911 and 1932), floods (1923 and 1942), and fires (1948). As the coal mines in the region gradually closed, Coleman's commercial importance waned in favour of Blairmore. On 3 November 1978, the Government of Alberta passed the Crowsnest Pass Municipal Unification Act, which led to the formal amalgamation of the Town of Coleman with the Village of Bellevue, the Town of Blairmore, the Village of Frank, and Improvement District (ID) No. 5 on 1 January 1979.

Coleman's coal mining heritage is evident in its several historic buildings, a regional museum, the ruins of its coal plant and coke ovens, several nearby abandoned mines, and the "biggest piggy bank in the world" made from a  gauge air driven thermos bottle mine locomotive. Much of the downtown section now forms the Coleman National Historic Site.

Geography

Climate 
Coleman has a subarctic climate (Dfc) with mild to warm summers and cold, snowy winters.

Demographics 

As a population centre in the 2016 Census of Population conducted by Statistics Canada, Coleman recorded a population of 1,475 living in 696 of its 891 total private dwellings, an  change from its 2011 population of 1,366.

Notable people
 Joe Kryczka, Justice of the Court of Queen's Bench of Alberta, president of the Canadian Amateur Hockey Association

See also 
List of former urban municipalities in Alberta

References 

Crowsnest Pass, Alberta
Former towns in Alberta
National Historic Sites in Alberta
Populated places disestablished in 1979